Tucanoichthys tucano is a species of characin endemic to Brazil, where it is found in the Uaupés River.  It is the only member of its genus.

References
 

Characidae
Monotypic fish genera
Fish of South America
Fish of Brazil
Taxa named by Jacques Géry
Taxa named by Uwe Römer (ichthyologist)
Endemic fauna of Brazil
Fish described in 1997